East Coast Derby is the name given to a football derby match between Malaysian teams Kelantan FA and Terengganu F.C. I. The rivalry between the teams has developed since the 1980s and is known for the intense fan engagement on both sides.

History 

Kelantan FA was founded in 1946 as the Kelantan Amateur Football Association (Malay: Persatuan Bola Sepak Amatur Kelantan). In 1986, the former chief minister of Kelantan, Datuk Haji Ahmad Rastom Haji Ahmad Maher was appointed president.

Terengganu F.C. I was founded in 1956 as Terengganu Football Association. In 1999, Dato' Haji Che Mat bin Jusoh, who was the Terengganu President at that time, was appointed to lead the team.

The teams developed a regional rivalry in Malaysia's east coast starting in the mid 1980s. They have been less successful in comparison to their neighbours Pahang FA.

However, the only time the East Coast derby was ever contested with a title in stake was in the 2011 Malaysia FA Cup final. Terengganu F.C. I won the match 2-1, after extra time.

Stadiums

List of Matches 

From 1983 to current

Statistics 
From 1983 to current

Last updated: 6 February 2018

Honours 
Kelantan FA have a more illustrious honours with 11 titles compare to Terengganu F.C. I (7). Kelantan is also one of the only two Malaysian football teams of achieving The Treble, in 2012. The other is Kedah FA (2006/07, 2007/08).

See also 
Klang Valley Derby
Malayan El'Clasico
 List of association football rivalries
 List of sports rivalries

References

External links 
2006–2008 Records
2005–2006 Records
2004 Records
2001-2003,2006-current Records
1983-current Records

Malaysia football derbies
Kelantan FA
Terengganu FC